Maasara is a village that belongs to Mit Ghamr, Dakahlia Governorate, in Egypt. 

According to the 2006 Egypt Census, the total population of Al Maasara and its sub-villages was about 5,756 persons of which 3,055 are males and 2,701 are females.

References

External links
 Censuses of Egypt.
 Demographics of Egypt.
 Central Agency for Public Mobilization and Statistics.
 Census 2006 database - "البيانات السكانية لمدينة أو قرية حسب تقديرات السكان 2006". الجهاز المصري المركزي للإحصاء.

Villages in Egypt
Populated places in Dakahlia Governorate